3 Idiotas is a 2017 Mexican coming-of-age comedy-drama film, which is a remake of the 2009 Indian film 3 Idiots. 3 Idiotas is directed by Carlos Bolado and produced by Miguel Mier, Bernardo Rugama and Jimena Rodríguez. The film stars Alfonso Dosal, Christian Vázquez, German Valdez and Martha Higareda.

Plot
Two nerdy friends and their arch rival from college embark on an adventure determined to find a college roommate who disappeared without a trace on graduation day.

Cast

Release
3 Idiotas was released on March 31, 2017 by Lionsgate and its Pantelion Films banner.

Box office
The film was a box office hit in Mexico, selling more than  tickets and becoming the highest-grossing domestic film during the first half of 2017. It grossed MX$125.6 million in Mexico, making it the second highest-grossing Mexican film of 2017 below Do It Like an Hombre.

References

External links
 
 

Films set in universities and colleges
2010s buddy comedy-drama films
Films about education
2010s coming-of-age comedy-drama films
Mexican coming-of-age films
Films based on Indian novels
Films directed by Carlos Bolado
Remakes of Indian films
Lionsgate films
2017 comedy films
2017 drama films
Mexican comedy-drama films
2010s Mexican films